Brothers Dan (born 1931) and Frank Carney (April 26, 1938 – December 2, 2020) were American businessmen who founded Pizza Hut.

Early years 
Dan and Frank Carney were born into a blended family of twelve children, and raised in Wichita, Kansas, where Dan still lives today. Although Frank Carney dropped out of Wichita State University, where he studied engineering, he later returned to the university to receive a degree in general studies and mathematics.

Pizza Hut
In 1958, the brothers borrowed $600 from their mother and opened a pizza restaurant catering to students after a local real estate agent with an unrented building convinced them that pizza would be a promising business. Although they knew little about pizza-making or business, they learned quickly and the business started to grow. Their first franchise opened in Topeka, Kansas in 1959. The Pizza Hut in Aggieville, Kansas was the first to have delivery, an innovation. By 1977, Pizza Hut had grown to 4,000 outlets and the brothers decided to sell the business to PepsiCo for over $300 million USD. Frank remained the president and a board member of Pizza Hut until 1980.

The Carney brothers have been featured in the History Channel series The Food That Built America.

Later years

Frank 
Frank became a franchisee of Papa John's Pizza in 1994. By 2001, he owned 133 locations. Based in Houston, his company runs stores in Kansas, Arizona, Missouri, California, Texas and Hawaii, including several in his hometown of Wichita and the suburbs of Derby and Andover, under the franchise name PJ Wichita LLC., before selling the franchise to then Franchise President Terry Newman. During legal struggles with Pizza Hut in the late 1990s, Papa John's ran commercial advertisements highlighting the fact, including a dramatization showing Frank coming to a Pizza Hut stockholders' meeting wearing a Papa John's apron, saying, "Sorry, guys. I found a better pizza."

Frank sat on the board of Intrust Financial Corp., Intrust Bank, N.A. He was the past president of the International Franchise Association (IFA) and the Wichita Area Chamber of Commerce. Industry honors include the 1975 Silver Plate Award from the International Foodservice Manufacturers Association, and the 1974 Man Of The Year in the Multi-Unit Foodservice Organization. He was a 1991 inductee into the IFA Hall of Fame.

Frank was diagnosed with Alzheimer's disease in 2009. He died from pneumonia on December 2, 2020, at the age of 82.

Dan 
Dan, who has maintained strong community ties to his hometown, has been Chairman of the Board of Cerebral Palsy Research Foundation of Kansas, since its inception of 30 years, a charitable organization and not-for-profit business. He sits on the board of the WSU Foundation, Guadalupe Clinic, Wichita Red Cross and Wichita Community Foundation. Dan has been awarded the W.S.U. Presidents Medal of Distinguished Alumnus Award, and the Big Brother/Big Sisters 'Reaching the Summit' honor. In 1977, he was the first inductee into the Pizza Hut Hall of Fame and in 2001 he was awarded the Junior Achievement Wichita Business Hall of Fame.
 	
Dan spent several years of his adult life playing recreational polo along with his son, professional polo player, Mike Carney, president of Fairfield Polo Club in Wichita, Kansas.

References

External links
Pizza Hut Official Website

Sibling duos
American food company founders
Pizza chain founders
Wichita State University alumni
Pizza Hut